Bududa General Hospital, also Bududa Hospital, is a hospital in the Eastern Region of Uganda.

Location
The coordinates of Bududa Hospital are:01°00'34.0"N; 34°19'58.0"E (Latitude:1°00'34.0"N; Longitude:34°19'58.0"E).

Overview
Bududa Hospital, with bed capacity of 100, was built in the 1960s by the government of Prime Minister Milton Obote (1962 - 1971). The hospital has not received any renovations since it was constructed. Like many of Uganda's public hospitals, Bududa General Hospital is understaffed, over-crowded, underfunded and operated with antiquated or absent equipment.

See also
List of hospitals in Uganda

References

External links
 Website of Uganda Ministry of Health
  Uganda: Bududa landslides: One month down the road, what has been done? - Uganda Red Cross: 1 April 2010
 Uganda: How Candidates Plan to Fix Ailing Healthcare - 21 December 2015

Hospitals in Uganda
Bududa District
Bugisu sub-region
Eastern Region, Uganda
Hospitals established in 1969
1969 establishments in Uganda